State Route 252 (SR 252) is a south–north road in Williamson County, Tennessee that connects Arrington with Brentwood.

Route description 

SR 252 begins as Wilson Pike in Arrington at an intersection with SR 96. It goes north through farmland to enter the Brentwood city limits before having intersections with SR 441 and SR 253. It begins paralleling I-65 before entering downtown and coming to an intersection with Church Street.  SR 252 then turns west along Church Street to pass under I-65 to come to an end at US 31/SR 6 less than a half-mile away.

Major intersections

See also 
List of state routes in Tennessee

References 

252